Satleq Bay-ye Zeytunli (also Romanized as Sātleq Bāy-ye Zeytūnlī; also known as Shātleqbāy-ye Zeytūnlī) is a village in Nezamabad Rural District, in the Central District of Azadshahr County, Golestan Province, Iran. At the 2006 census, its population was 348, in 84 families.

References 

Populated places in Azadshahr County